Luther Alexander Johnson (October 29, 1875 – June 6, 1965) was a United States Congressman from the U.S. state of Texas.

Early years

Luther was born in Corsicana, Texas, where he attended the public schools. He received his L.L.B. in 1896 from Cumberland University in Lebanon, Tennessee, and was admitted to the Bar association the same year. He  commenced practice in Corsicana and was attorney for Central Texas Grocery Company and The Royall Coffee Company.

He was a prosecuting attorney of Navarro County from 1898 to 1902 and district attorney of the thirteenth judicial district of Texas from 1904 to 1910.

Congress

He served as a delegate to the Democratic National Convention in 1916 and as chairman of the Democratic State convention in 1920. Johnson was elected as a Democrat to the Sixty-eighth and to the eleven succeeding Congresses and served from March 4, 1923, until his resignation on July 17, 1946.

A confidential 1943 analysis of the House Foreign Affairs Committee by Isaiah Berlin for the British Foreign Office described Johnson as

In his legislative role Johnson was most famous for his part in the passage of the Radio Act of 1927, stating that

Later years

Johnson was appointed by President Harry S. Truman to be a judge of the United States Tax Court, holding this office from July 1946 until his retirement in September 1956. He returned to Corsicana until his death there on June 6, 1965. He was interred in Oakwood Cemetery.

Personal life

Luther Alexander Johnson married Turner Read on July 19, 1899.  The couple had two children.  He became a ruling Elder in the Westminster Presbyterian Church (USA), where the couple had lifelong membership.

Fraternal memberships

Kappa Sigma
Lions Clubs International
Odd Fellows

References

External links

Luther Johnson Congressional biography

1875 births
1965 deaths
Judges of the United States Tax Court
United States Article I federal judges appointed by Harry S. Truman
20th-century American judges
Democratic Party members of the United States House of Representatives from Texas
Cumberland University alumni